Aleš Pipan (born 24 May 1959) is a Slovenian basketball coach and former basketball player, who is currently coach of Šentjur in the Liga Nova KBM.

Coaching career 
Pipan coached Slovenia at the EuroBasket 2005, 2006 FIBA World Championship and EuroBasket 2007 until resignation in 2008, when Slovenia didn't make through additional qualifications for 2008 Summer Olympics. Before that, he was present in Slovenian national team as coach assistant since 1998.

Pipan came to Zlatorog Laško in 1996 and established the club as one of Slovenian best, especially known as one that works very well with young players. He led the club to the Saporta Cup in 1997 and 1998. In 1999 he took them to the quarterfinals where they lost to Aris, but earned them the right to play the EuroLeague next year. In those two seasons in the Saporta Cup he helped develop two national team players to the international scene, Sani Bečirovič and Goran Jurak. The next season (1999–2000) was the first year that two Slovenian clubs played in the Euroleague. However, in domestic competition Pipan reached two finals but failed to collect any trophy, as some key players, including Boštjan Nachbar and Mileta Lisica were struggling with injuries.

In 2000, he took over Krka and led them in Suproleague, EuroLeague in 2001/02, domestic competitions and first edition of Adriatic League until he was replaced with Neven Spahija in December 2001. He was first Slovenian coach to beat teams like Panathinaikos B.C. and Maccabi Tel Aviv B.C.

After brief episode in small club Zagorje he returned to Pivovarna Laško in 2003–04 season, where he won Slovenian cup and lost in final of domestic league to Olimpija. After another year with Pivovarna Laško he took over Slovan from Ljubljana in season 2005–06, where he lost another final of domestic league to Olimpija in best of five series in 2006, but impress with affirmation of some young players in the Adriatic League (especially Goran Dragić ) and better result than his everlasting opponent Olimpija in that competition. One season later he resigned in the middle of season.

Pipan took over Anwil in January 2007. After two months of working with the team he won with Anwil Włocławek Polish Cup (2007) beating the Euroleague team Prokom Trefl Sopot in the final. He finished 2006–07 season at the fourth place, losing 3-4 in the semi-final against Prokom Trefl Sopot. In revenge he beat Prokom Trefl Sopot again in the Super-Cup game that opened 2007–08 season in Poland.

In the 2009, he returned to his former club, now known under new name Zlatorog (formerly Pivovarna laško). After two years he took over KK Zadar in Croatian league and qualify with them for Adriatic basketball league. In October 2012 he took over MZT Skopje and won the Macedonian championship.

Pipan has become well known for promoting, developing and coaching young players like Goran Jurak, Sani Bečirovič, Boštjan Nachbar, Nebojša Joksimović, Aleksander Ćapin, Jaka Lakovič, Goran Dragić, Hasan Rizvić, Emir Preldžič, Mirza Begić, Gašper Vidmar, Jaka Klobučar, and Damjan Stojanovski.

On 28 June 2018 he was named the head coach of KK Zadar of the Croatian League and Adriatic League, but after just four months, he was sacked on 23 October 2018 because of poor results.

Clubs

Head coach
 1993–1996: Maribor in Slovenian League 
 1997–2000: Zlatorog Laško in Slovenian League 
 2000–2002: Krka in Slovenian League 
 2002–2003: Zagorje in Slovenian League 
 2003–2005: Zlatorog Laško in Slovenian League 
 2005–2007: Slovan in Slovenian League 
 2007–2008: Anwil Włocławek in Polish League
 2008–2011: Zlatorog Laško in Slovenian League
 2011–2012: KK Zadar in Croatian League
 2012–2013: MZT Skopje in Macedonian League
 2013–2015: Olimpija in Slovenian League
 2015: MZT Skopje in Macedonian League
 2015–2018: Zlatorog Laško in Slovenian League
 2018: Zadar in Croatian League
 2019: TF Budapest in Hungarian league
 2019–2020: Šentjur in Slovenian League
 2022-present: Zlatorog Laško in Slovenian League

Head coaching career with national teams
 1998–2003: Slovenia national basketball team (assistant)
 2004–2008: Slovenia national basketball team
 2010–2013: Polish national basketball team
 2013: Macedonia national basketball team

References

Pivovarna Laško in Saporta cup 1997/98 season
Pivovarna Laško in Saporta cup, 1998/99 season
Pivovarna Laško in Euroleague, 1999/2000 season
Krka in Suproleague
Basketball association of Slovenia
WC coach profile

1959 births
Living people
KK Zadar coaches
KK Olimpija coaches
KK Krka coaches
Slovenian men's basketball players
Slovenian basketball coaches
Yugoslav men's basketball players
Basketball players from Ljubljana
Slovenia national basketball team coaches